Agbis may refer to:
Ağbiş, village in Azerbaijan 
Association of Governing Bodies of Independent Schools (AGBIS), British organisation
Agribusiness